is a city located in Tochigi Prefecture, Japan. , the city had an estimated population of 60,274 in 24,654 households, and a population density of 810 persons per km².

Geography
Shimotsuke is located in southern Tochigi Prefecture.

Surrounding municipalities
Tochigi Prefecture
 Utsunomiya
 Oyama
 Tochigi
 Mooka
 Mibu
 Kaminokawa

Climate
Shimotsuke has a Humid continental climate (Köppen Cfa) characterized by warm summers and cold winters with heavy snowfall.  The average annual temperature in Shimotsuke is 13.9 °C. The average annual rainfall is 1373 mm with September as the wettest month. The temperatures are highest on average in August, at around 26.2 °C, and lowest in January, at around 2.4 °C.

Demographics
Per Japanese census data, the population of Shimotsuke has recently plateaued after a long period of growth.

History
The city of Shimotsuke was established on January 10, 2006, from the merger of the towns of Minamikawachi (from Kawachi District), and the towns of Kokubunji and Ishibashi (both from Shimotsuga District).

Government
Shimotsuke has a mayor-council form of government with a directly elected mayor and a unicameral city legislature council of 18 members. Shimotsuke contributes one member to the Tochigi Prefectural Assembly. In terms of national politics, the city is divided between the Tochigi 1st district and the Tochigi 4th district of the lower house of the Diet of Japan.

Economy
Agriculture and light manufacturing are mainstays of the local economy, with production of Kanpyō, turmeric and spinach being prominent local crops. The city is increasingly a bedroom community for neighboring Utsunomiya.

Education
Jichi Medical University
 Shimotsuke also has twelve public primary schools and two public middle schools operated by the town government. The town has one public high school operated by the Tochigi Prefectural Board of Education. The prefecture also operates one special education school for the handicapped.

Transportation

Railway
 JR East – Tōhoku Main Line (Utsunomiya Line)
 -  -

Highway

Local attractions
Shimotsuke Kokubun-ji ruins, National Historic Site
Shimotsuke Kokubunni-ji ruins, National Historic Site
Shimotsuke Yakushi-ji temple and grave of Dōkyō, National Historic Site
Kabutozuka Kofun, National Historic Site
Koganei Ichirizuka, National Historic Site

International relations
 – Dietzhölztal, Hesse, Germany – Friendship city

Noted people from Shimotsuke
Eiji Ochiai, professional baseball player
Arisa Komiya, actress and voice actress

References

External links

Website 

Cities in Tochigi Prefecture
Shimotsuke, Tochigi